Taka Shibata (10 October 1916 – 1991) was a Japanese sprinter. She competed in the women's 100 metres at the 1932 Summer Olympics.

References

External links
 

1916 births
1991 deaths
Athletes (track and field) at the 1932 Summer Olympics
Japanese female sprinters
Olympic athletes of Japan
Place of birth missing
Olympic female sprinters
20th-century Japanese women